Robert Gebhardt (20 September 1920 – 8 February 1986) was a German footballer and manager. As a player, he won the 1948 German championship with 1. FC Nürnberg. He also managed several clubs in the Bundesliga, spending two years in charge of MSV Duisburg, followed by a further two years at Werder Bremen before returning to Nürnberg in 1978.

External links

1920 births
1986 deaths
German footballers
Association football midfielders
1. FC Nürnberg players
FC St. Pauli players
German football managers
BC Augsburg managers
MSV Duisburg managers
Bundesliga managers
SV Werder Bremen managers
FC Wacker Innsbruck managers
1. FC Nürnberg managers
KSV Hessen Kassel managers
Arminia Bielefeld managers
Luftwaffen-SV Hamburg players